Cori is a lunar impact crater that is located in the southern hemisphere on the far side of the Moon. It lies less than one crater diameter to the north of the crater Baldet. To the northeast is the crater Grissom. It is named after Gerty Cori, the first American woman to win the Nobel Prize and the first woman to win the prize in the category Nobel Prize in Physiology or Medicine.

This is a circular crater formation with a somewhat eroded outer rim. The inner wall has a shelf running around the western perimeter where the material has slumped somewhat from the edge. There is a small outward break in the northern wall, and a small crater lies against the eastern inner wall. The interior floor is marked by a few tiny craterlets, but no ridges or irregularities of note.

Satellite craters 

By convention these features are identified on lunar maps by placing the letter on the side of the crater midpoint that is closest to Cori.

References

Bibliography 

 
 
 
 
 
 
 
 
 
 
 
 

Impact craters on the Moon